Edison Storage Battery Company Building, is located at 177 Main Street and Lakeside Avenue in West Orange, Essex County, New Jersey, United States. The building was added to the National Register of Historic Places on February 28, 1996.

The building was a manufacturing facility for Edison Storage Battery Company to make nickel-iron batteries developed by Thomas Edison in 1901. Manufacturing began around 1903 and was discontinued in 1975 when Edison Storage was sold to Exide.

See also
National Register of Historic Places listings in Essex County, New Jersey
Thomas Edison National Historical Park
Battery (electricity)

References

Buildings and structures in Essex County, New Jersey
West Orange, New Jersey
National Register of Historic Places in Essex County, New Jersey
Unused buildings in New Jersey
Industrial buildings and structures on the National Register of Historic Places in New Jersey
New Jersey Register of Historic Places
Battery (electricity)